Mott is a city in and the county seat of Hettinger County, North Dakota, United States. The population was 653 at the 2020 census.

History
Mott was founded in 1904 when territory was opened to settlers. There are conflicting stories of how the city was named.  Some say the city was named for Lillian Mott, the secretary of the town promoter, while others believe the city was named for C. W. Mott, a railroad employee. A post office has been in operation at Mott since 1904.

Geography
Mott is located at  (46.373506, -102.324916).

Climate

Demographics

2010 census
As of the census of 2010, there were 721 people, 315 households, and 191 families residing in the city. The racial makeup of the city was 97.9% White, 0.4% Native American, and 1.7% from two or more races.

There were 315 households, of which 21.6% had children under the age of 18 living with them, 53.0% were married couples living together, 7.0% had a female householder with no husband present, 0.6% had a male householder with no wife present, and 39.4% were non-families. 37.1% of all households were made up of individuals, and 23.2% had someone living alone who was 65 years of age or older. The average household size was 2.12 and the average family size was 2.75.

The median age in the city was 52.9 years. 20.4% of residents were under the age of 18; 3.6% were between the ages of 18 and 24; 15% were from 25 to 44; 27% were from 45 to 64; and 34% were 65 years of age or older. The gender makeup of the city was 47.2% male and 52.8% female.

2000 census
As of the census of 2000, there were 808 people, 362 households, and 205 families residing in the city. The population density was 894.4 people per square mile (346.6/km2). There were 441 housing units at an average density of 488.1 per square mile (189.2/km2). The racial makeup of the city was 99.50% White, 0.12% Native American, 0.25% Pacific Islander, and 0.12% from two or more races.

There were 362 households, out of which 22.4% had children under the age of 18 living with them, 50.6% were married couples living together, 5.5% had a female householder with no husband present, and 43.1% were non-families. 42.3% of all households were made up of individuals, and 27.6% had someone living alone who was 65 years of age or older. The average household size was 2.06 and the average family size was 2.83.

In the city, the population was spread out, with 20.8% under the age of 18, 3.0% from 18 to 24, 18.1% from 25 to 44, 23.9% from 45 to 64, and 34.3% who were 65 years of age or older. The median age was 51 years. For every 100 females, there were 87.0 males. For every 100 females age 18 and over, there were 86.6 males.

The median income for a household in the city was $27,583, and the median income for a family was $33,929. Males had a median income of $24,327 versus $15,833 for females. The per capita income for the city was $15,718. About 9.6% of families and 13.9% of the population were below the poverty line, including 21.5% of those under age 18 and 13.6% of those age 65 or over.

Education

Mott shares the Mott/Regent School District, a unified school district with nearby Regent. Grades K-12 are located in Mott. Prior to unification the Mott School District's mascot was the Cardinals.

Notable people

 James Bannon, Wisconsin state legislator and politician, moved to a farm in Mott in 1905.
 Eric Hardmeyer, president and CEO of the Bank of North Dakota
 James Kerzman, North Dakota state legislator, farmer, and rancher
 Melvin J. Miller, Minnesota state legislator and farmer
 Larry Woiwode, author and poet laureate of North Dakota

Notes

External links
 City of Mott official website

Cities in North Dakota
Cities in Hettinger County, North Dakota
County seats in North Dakota
Populated places established in 1904
1904 establishments in North Dakota